is a railway station in Nakamura-ku, Nagoya, Aichi Prefecture, Japan.

Line
Kintetsu Nagoya Line

Layout
Komeno Station has a side platform and an island platform serving three tracks on the ground, and the entrance is located in the north of Nagoya-bound platform, connecting to Kuwana-bound one with a level crossing. Track 3 is not for embarking or disembarking passengers but for chartered trains, deadhead trains and trains entering or leaving Tomiyoshi Inspection Komeno Branch Depot.

Platforms

Staff at this station 
The number of passengers per day of the station is as follows.

Year       number of people 

 2015 11 10     830
 2012 11 13     772
 2010 11  9      653
 2008 11 18     669
 2005 11  8      637

Surroundings
Scenic and historic sights
Empuku-ji
Chosho-ji
Kanayama Shrine
Kumano Shrine
Hakusansha
Shopping, market
Sasashima Raibu 21
ÆON Toen Taiko Shopping Center
Hotel Palace Nagoya
Hospital
Nagoya Central Hospital
Transportation
Koya Bridge
Sasashima-Komeno Overbridge
Sasashima-raibu Station - Aonami Line

References

Adjacent stations

Railway stations in Aichi Prefecture